Băsești is a commune in Maramureș County, Crișana, Romania. It is composed of four villages: Băsești, Odești (Vadafalva), Săliște (Kecskésfalva) and Stremț (Bükktótfalu).

Sights 
 Wooden Church in Odești, built in the 19th century (1832)
 Wooden Church in Săliște, built in the 20th century (1902)
 Gheorghe Pop de Băsești Memorial House

Notable people
Gheorghe Pop de Băsești (1835–1919), Austro-Hungarian and Romanian politician
Elena Pop-Hossu-Longin (1862–1940), Austro-Hungarian and Romanian writer, journalist and women's rights activist
Decebal Traian Remeș (1949–2020), Romanian politician

References

Communes in Maramureș County
Localities in Crișana